Siripaporn Nuanthakhamjan, also known as Baipat Siripaporn, is a snooker player from Thailand. She is the reigning world women's snooker champion. With compatriot Waratthanun Sukritthanes, she won the 2019 Women's Snooker World Cup. 

Nuanthakhamjan, from Chonnuri, started playing snooker aged 9, and was coached by her stepfather Pisit Chandsri, a two-time world over-40s champion. In 2014, she won the International Billiards and Snooker Federation Six-red snooker championship, with a 4–2 victory over Anastasia Nechaeva in the final, having earlier eliminated former IBSF world champion Ng On-yee.

Aged 15, she defeated Wongharuthai 4–2 in the final of the 2015 International Billiards and Snooker Federation (IBSF) World Under-21 Championship. Nuanthakhamjan whitewashed Vidya Pillai 4–0 in the final to win the 2016 IBSF 6-reds snooker title.

In 2022, she won the Thailand national 9-ball pool title by defeating Sukritthane 11–8 in the final, having earlier won the national snooker title.

Nuanthakhamjan reached the final of the 2023 World Women's Snooker Championship, after defeating defending champion Mink Nutcharut 5–2 in the their semi-final match. She took the title by defeating Bai Yulu 6–3 in the final after trailing 0–2.

Career finals

References

External links 
Siripaporn Nuanthakhamjan Profile at World Women's Snooker
Profile and results at WPBSA SnookerScores

Siripaporn Nuanthakhamjan
Female snooker players
Living people
Siripaporn Nuanthakhamjan